"You're the One For Me" is a song written by James "D. Train" Williams and Hubert Eaves III of D. Train, a New York based post-disco duo, released in 1981 by Prelude Records. "You're the One for Me" first charted on December 19, 1981, at number 53 on the Billboard dance singles chart. It was a number one dance hit for three weeks early in 1982. The single also made it to number thirteen on the soul singles chart. Later in 1982, "You're the One for Me" along with the track, "Keep On", would peak at number 2 on dance charts. "Keep On" peaked at number fifteen on the soul chart.

Background
Williams and Eaves III met in college in Brooklyn, NY while Eaves was still a jazz session musician and aspiring producer (he'd collaborated with fellow electronic soul act, Mtume). Using "D Train" (the moniker earned by Williams' "prowess on the football field") as a group name, they released their first song, "You're the One for Me" based on an idea Eaves had. Signing a contract with Prelude Records the song was released in 1981 as a 12" and 7" vinyl single in the United States, Canada, Germany, Portugal, United Kingdom, Mexico ('82), Spain ('82), Netherlands ('82), France ('82), Italy ('82), Austria ('90). Williams was the lead singer while Eaves was behind production and played most of the music. Their style of soul vocals combined with multi-layered electronics, drum machines, and prominent synth bass was typical of the New York electronic R&B sound of the early 1980s (retroactively known to DJs and record collectors as "boogie") and was also a progenitor of the old school hip-hop subgenre, electro, a year before the seminal electro track "Planet Rock" was released.

Upon release, they took the track to Frankie "Hollywood" Crocker at WBLS-FM: "Soon, it seemed like everywhere we went, the clubs had to play the song twice a night." The song also turned out to be commercially successful in the United Kingdom to which Williams adds, "I remember we were doing Top of the Pops with Sting and The Police over in London. They had a bar across the street and we went in there and they were playing it too! Then, a third club was playing it! That's how popular the record was and that's the God's honest truth." They also developed a loyal LGBTQ following during their Prelude years, as gay clubs were among the first to play D. Train's records.  "I learned that all people have the same needs, whether they are straight or gay. We all need love." Williams added.

Composition
"You're the One for Me" is a post-disco song with soul vocals, which runs for 6 minutes and 59 seconds for the 12-inch vocal version. Notably, it was influential in the electro genre. It has a tempo of 120 beats per minute.

Critical reception
Daryl Easlea from BBC wrote, "their mixture of electronics and emotion led to some compelling moments, most notably their calling card and most enduring anthem, "You're the One for Me". With its sequenced handclaps, thundering synth bass and its fluttery, repetitive electronic melody, the song is enlivened by Williams' throaty delivery." He also notes on the gospel touch of Williams' singing, "[w]hen he sings the repeated refrain of 'With the love I have inside of me, we could turn this world around,' over the breakdown, it is like the world's most charismatic preacher encapsulating the remarkable purity and longing of the first flush of true love."

Rock music critic Robert Christgau rated the album the song is from B+ and wrote, "Their burgeoning street rep reflects the burly appeal of James Williams, who sings lead like the president of the Teddy Pendergrass Fan Club, Boys and Girls High chapter. More power to him. But their chart success reflects the complete control of keyboard pro, Hubert Eaves III. Hooks don't grow on streets."

Track listings

1981-82 releases
12" vinyl
 US: Prelude Records / PRL D 621
 France: Pathé Marconi EMI / 2C 052 52903 Z
 Canada: Prelude Records / SPEC-1237
 Spain: Prelude Records / 1-20.004

7" vinyl
 Italy: Prelude Records / PRL 10376

1985 release
12" vinyl
 UK: Prelude Records / ZT 40302

Chart performance

Personnel
 Hubert Eaves III, James "D-Train" Williams – music and lyrics
 Hubert Eaves III – mix, production 
 François Kevorkian – mix

additional personnel for 1981 version
 Herb Powers Jr. – mastering
 John Potoker – engineer
 Sound Lab Studios by "Pete & Mike" – recording
 Sigma Sound NYC. – mix

Other versions
In 1985, Paul Hardcastle cut a remixed version which reached No.15 on the UK Singles Chart. This version didn't stray too far from the original 1982 hit. The song provided the background sample for Eleanor's song "Adventure," which reached number one Billboard's Dance Club Play chart in 1988.  In 2011, pop star Prince performed a cover version of the song on Lopez Tonight featuring his backup singers, with Shelby J. on lead vocals & Sheila E. on percussion to launch his 21 Nights in Los Angeles. The song was also featured in the video game Grand Theft Auto V (2013) and in the film The Football Factory (2004) and Glitter (2001). 2015 Paul Kalkbrenner published his single Cloud Rider which is based on the song You're the One for Me.

Sampling
The Prodigy have sampled this song in their 2004 single "Girls", from the album Always Outnumbered, Never Outgunned.

References

1981 debut singles
D Train (entertainer) songs
Prelude Records (record label) singles
Songs written by Hubert Eaves III
1981 songs